Amadou Bâ (11 December 1892 – 6 March 1967), also known as Doudou Ba, was a Senegalese politician, adjunct to the mayor of Dakar and minister.

Biography
In the 1920s, Amadou Bâ was the secretary of the writer Massyla Diop, who was the founding-editor of the journals Le Sénégal moderne (Modern Senegal) and Revue africaine littéraire et artistique (African Literary and Artistic Review), with Marcel Sableau.

On 17 August 1946, Bâ founded an ephemeral political party, the African Autonomist Movement (MAA) in Dakar.

He was the father of the writer Mariama Bâ and magistrate Mody Bâ.

References

Bibliography
Babacar Ndiaye and Waly Ndiaye, Présidents et ministres de la République du Sénégal, Dakar, 2006 (2nd edn), p. 51.

External links
Liste des ministres de la Santé depuis 1957 (website of the Ministry of Health and Prevention)

1892 births
1967 deaths
Health ministers of Senegal
Health in Senegal